Nasty Suicide (born Jan-Markus Stenfors on 27 February 1963) is a Finnish musician. He is most famous for being one of the founding members of Hanoi Rocks, the group's rhythm guitarist between 1979 and 1985. Hanoi Rocks was a Finnish rock band that combined elements of punk, glam rock, rock and roll, and blues. Before his tenure in Hanoi Rocks, Suicide played guitar in a Finnish punk band called Briard in the late 1970s. Suicide replaced Andy McCoy in Briard after McCoy joined Pelle Miljoona Oy. After the breakup of Hanoi Rocks in 1985, he and his former bandmate Andy McCoy recorded an acoustic album under the name The Suicide Twins which was released in 1986 and was titled Silver Missiles and Nightingales. At the same time McCoy and Suicide started The Cherry Bombz, which included Timo Caltio on bass (later replaced by Dave Tregunna), Terry Chimes on drums and singer Anita Chellemah. The Cherry Bombz released two EPs: The Cherry Bombz (1985) and House Of Ecstasy (1986) as well as a live album, Coming Down Slow (1986). After The Cherry Bombz Nasty went on to form his own band Cheap and Nasty, which was active from 1990 to 1994.

In 1988 Suicide made a short appearance in Guns N' Roses' music video for "Paradise City".

Nasty Suicide also appears on Michael Monroe's second solo album Not Fakin' It, released in 1989, as a co-writer and guitarist. Suicide was also a member of Monroe's band Demolition 23 in the early nineties, in which he replaced original guitarist Jay Hening. After the breakup of Demolition 23, Suicide recorded an album under his given name, titled Vinegar Blood, in 1996; it was released in Finland only.

Suicide retired from the rock scene in the mid-1990s and moved back to Finland (which was the reason why Demolition 23 broke up), where he finally finished his studies in high school. After graduating from high school, he educated himself as a pharmacist and currently works in a drug company in Finland. Suicide made a few guest appearances with the reformed Hanoi Rocks in the 2000s.

In 2010, Suicide also played a show with Michael Monroe in August 2010 at Ankkarock Festival, replacing Steve Conte who had to cancel due to family reasons. Since then, he has made some guest appearances with Monroe's band.

References

1963 births
Living people
Rhythm guitarists
Hanoi Rocks members
Finnish heavy metal guitarists
Swedish-speaking Finns
People from Sipoo
Glam rock musicians